Voroshilovsky bridge is a bridge in Rostov-on-Don over the river Don.
It was built in 1961–1965 by project engineer N. I. Kuznetsov and architect S. A. Kleiman. During the building of bridge glue joints were used. This was the first use ever of this technique instead of welded and bolt connections. The bridge connects Rostov with other city-satellites, including Bataisk and Azov. The bridge got its name due to being a continuation of the avenue of the same name.

History
Vorshilovsky bridge had been being built since 1961 to 1965 year. Engineer N. I. Kuznetsov and architect Sh. A. Kleiman were projecting it. Voroshilovsky bridge's foundation has finished the plan of post-war reconstruction that has started in 1947 at the initiative of the first secretary N. S. Patolichev of the Rostov Regional Committee of the VKP(b). The bridge was built with a new technology for its time.

Concrete blocks weighting to 30 tons each were fixed not with usual welding or rivets but with glue. It allowed not to use welded and bolted connections. Rectangular reinforced concrete blocks were fixed with adhesive glue between n-shaped supports. Steel cables, on which all construction was stringed, were stretched out through them. It was the first experience of such building in USSR. Technologies of pre-stressed reinforced concrete structures were advanced.

The bridge in the Budionosky avenue's alignment was the main ferry to the left bank on the Don river. The idea of foundation the obelisk, indicating the border of Europe and Asia, on the bridge was discussed at the construction stage, because, according to one version, the border between two parts of the world passed along the Don. But the project was not realised.

Description
Voroshilovsky bridge is an important architectural element of Rostov-on-Don. The connection with the surrounding landscape and the combination with the city panorama were thought out by the authors of the project. The rapid horizontal of the bridge, which is a continuation of the line of Voroshilovsky Avenue, smoothly passes into the line of the embankment of the left Bank, going into the distance of the road. The picturesque silhouette of the bridge attracts tourists and citizens. Due to the smooth curvature of the spans, elegant and strict supports, the bridge seems light and harmonious. The length of the bridge is 620 meters, width-12 meters, height above the river-32 meters; under it can pass river vessels of all types.

Bridge state

On 22 October 2007, during the planned inspection of Voroshilovsky bridge, a crack was found, so that the bridge was closed to all modes of transport, and then to pedestrians for an indefinite time. This increased the load on the other two bridges and further aggravated the traffic situation in the city. In December 2007, 2 free "accordion" buses were launched on the bridge, which move only within the bridge and carry passengers from one end of the bridge to the other.

Since 27 December 2007, regular traffic of city and "batay" buses has been resumed, provided that there is no more than one bus on the bridge and movement only along the Eastern roadway of the bridge. On 23 June 2008, traffic was opened on Voroshilov bridge (except trucks). On 25 July 2008, traffic was blocked along Sivers street in the area of Bakery No. 1 for the construction of a new bridge across the Don river.

Bridge reconstruction

Until the end of 2017, the authorities of Rostov-on-don intend to reconstruct the Voroshilov bridge, expanding it from two available lanes to six. This indicator is planned to be achieved by building two new bridges on the site of the old one, with a separate span section for 3 lanes in one direction for each, externally similar to the old bridge. There are some differences in the project – new bridges have spans of steel, significantly expanded the main shipping span (for which the old supports in the middle of the don removed), reduced the number of supports in the left bank.

The distance between the axes of old and new supports is planned-14.4 m, between the edges of the bridge structures 1-1.5 m. the Design capacity of the bridge-understudy – 66 540 cars per day, width 36 meters, width of sidewalks 3 meters; the length of the bridge over the water barrier – 624.2 m, with access roads – 1 821 meters.

According to the scheme and the render provided by the MCU "Directorate for construction of transport infrastructure facilities in Rostov-on-don", in the process of reconstruction, the bridge is planned to be equipped with 4 elevators, 2 on each Bank, as well as visors of a translucent structure over the pedestrian part.

Construction and installation work began in the autumn of 2013, the completion of works was planned by 30 November 2017; the total cost of the work is estimated at 6.03 billion rubles. The works are ahead of schedule, the Central span of the 2nd bridge is installed on 20 October 2016.

Since 15 February 2014, traffic on the old Voroshilovsky bridge was closed, and the bridge was completely dismantled. The decision to close the bridge was made on the basis of the conclusion of the Institute "Protectstructure". The survey revealed an increase in inelastic deformations of the superstructures, and the total deflection was 63 centimeters.

Since 11 August 2015, the working movement on the riding (left) part of the Voroshilov bridge was opened

From 13 September 2017, the working movement on the riding (right) part of the Voroshilov bridge was opened.

References 

Bridges in Rostov-on-Don
Road bridges in Russia
Bridges completed in 1965
1965 establishments in Russia